Neottiella rutilans is a species of apothecial fungus belonging to the family Pyronemataceae. This European species appears in autumn as bright yellowish-orange discs among Polytrichum and related mosses.

Description
This cup fungus has a shallow, somewhat uneven cup and a short stem. The upper surface is yellow, often tinged with reddish-orange, and the underside is covered by a dense felting of white hairs.

Ecology
This fungus tends to grow among mosses, particularly Polytrichum species, on sandy soils on heaths and drier moorland, appearing in the autumn and winter.
Like other cup fungi, the upper surface is the spore-producing surface and as it faces upwards, the spores cannot fall out. Instead, the spores are ejected when the fungus is disturbed; if the cup is given a sharp tap when it is mature, a cloud of spores rises in a thin mist.

References

External links

Neottiella rutilans at Species Fungorum

Pezizales
Fungi described in 1822
Taxa named by Elias Magnus Fries